Baseboard can refer to:
Baseboard - a type of wooden, plastic, MDF or Styrofoam trim installed along the bottom of a wall
Motherboard - a computer component
Base board - a type of heater, see Hydronics
Base board - the wooden board that scenery and track is attached to in Rail transport modelling